Mubarack Nissa (born 31 January 1981) is an Indian-origin contemporary artist and curator based in Dubai. She is known for her abstract and sculpture paintings. Her work is based on conceptual art and depicts core attributes of feminism, diversity, liberty, emotions, minimalism, and surrealism.

Early life and education 
Mubarack Nissa was born in Dharmadom, Kannur District in Kerala, to MP Anwer and Naseema. She completed her high school diploma from Govt. girls' high school in Thalassery in the Year 1996. Later, she attended Calicut University and got her bachelor's degree in Computer Science in 2002.

In 2015, Nissa obtained a diploma in Fine Arts from the London College of Art. She then moved to Russia to learn sculpture painting and completed Masterclass Sculpture Painting from Evgenia Ermilova School.

After returning to the UK, she enrolled in Central Saint Martin's University and obtained a Contemporary Drawing and Painting certification in 2021. She then got a certification in Art History (Cave Drawings to Banksy) from Art for Introvert School in the USA in the Year. She pursued her MA Emphasis in Painting and drawing in The Academy of Art University, San Francisco, USA, under the International Student's Scholarship in the year 2021.

Career 
She began her career as an artist in 2007. Her paintings have been exhibited in Dubai, Kunst Haus Wien Museum Hundertwasser in Austria, Darbar Art Gallery, and Kerala Lalitha Kala Academy and Durbar Hall in India.

In 2016, She curated a group exhibition named "Synchronicity" in Dubai. She was in the World Art Dubai 2016 (Soliloquy). and her artwork "Liberty" was exhibited across the city. Etihad Art Gallery, Abu Dhabi, curated her solo exhibition in Radisson Blu, Dubai, in 2017. In 2020, her work was featured by Dubai culture at Expo 2020.

Nissa is a recipient of the Dr. Mangalam Swaminathan National Award (2021) and the UAE National Day Award.

References 

Indian artists
Indian contemporary artists
Living people
1981 births